Centese Calcio Associazione Sportiva Dilettantistica  (commonly referred to as Centese) is an Italian association football club located in Cento, Emilia-Romagna. It currently plays in Promozione. Its colors are blue and white.

The current club took the place of the historical Associazione Calcio Centese that went bankrupt in 2016 . The club was formerly known as Centese Calcio .

Centese spent the 1947–48 season in Serie B North.

References
La Storia
Almanacco del Calcio Centese

External links
Official homepage

Football clubs in Italy
Football clubs in Emilia-Romagna
Association football clubs established in 1913
Serie B clubs
Serie C clubs
Serie D clubs
1913 establishments in Italy